Hotarugaike Station (蛍池駅) is an express station on the Hankyu Takarazuka Line and also serves the Osaka Monorail Main Line, on which it is a major transfer point for and the last stop before Osaka International Airport. Hotarugaike is located in Toyonaka, Osaka.

Layout
Hankyu Railway Takarazuka Line (Station No. HK-47)
There are two side platforms with two tracks on the ground level.

Osaka Monorail Main Line (Station No. 12)
There is an island platform with two tracks elevated.

Adjacent stations

Railway stations in Osaka Prefecture
Railway stations in Japan opened in 1910